Paolo Patrucchi (born September 22, 1908 in Mortara) was an Italian professional football player.

He played for 3 seasons (46 games, 3 goals) in the Serie A for A.S. Casale Calcio, A.S. Bari and A.S. Roma.

1908 births
Year of death missing
Italian footballers
Serie A players
Casale F.B.C. players
S.S.C. Bari players
Novara F.C. players
A.S. Roma players
Association football forwards